Margot Bennett may refer to:
 Margot Bennett (writer) (1912–1980), Scottish writer of crime, thriller and science fiction novels 
 Margot Bennett (actress) (born 1935), American publicist and former actress